Plymouth Historic District is a national historic district located at Plymouth, Washington County, North Carolina. The district encompasses 258 contributing buildings, 5 contributing sites, and 1 contributing structure in the central business district and surrounding residential sections of Plymouth. It was largely developed between about 1880 and 1930 and includes notable examples of Colonial Revival, Bungalow / American Craftsman and Late Victorian style architecture.  Located in the district are the separately listed Latham House, Perry-Spruill House, and Washington County Courthouse. Other notable buildings include the Hornthal-Owens Building (c. 1885), Blount Building (c. 1916), Atlantic Coast Line Railroad Station (1923), Davenport-Davis House (c. 1898), Robert Ward Johnston House (1924), Latham-Brinkley House (1883), Plymouth United Methodist Church and Cemetery (c. 1860s), Grace Episcopal Church and Cemetery (1860-1861, 1892-1893) designed by Richard Upjohn, New Chapel Baptist Church (1924), Agricultural Building (1936-1937) constructed through the Works Progress Administration, Plvmouth Railroad Station (1927), Brinkley Commercial Block (1926), and Clark-Chesson House (c. 1810).

It was listed on the National Register of Historic Places in 1991.

References

Works Progress Administration in North Carolina
Victorian architecture in North Carolina
Colonial Revival architecture in North Carolina
Buildings and structures in Washington County, North Carolina
National Register of Historic Places in Washington County, North Carolina
Historic districts on the National Register of Historic Places in North Carolina